Sinoceratops  is an extinct genus of ceratopsian dinosaur that lived approximately 73 million years ago during the latter part of the Cretaceous Period in what is now Shandong province in China. It was named in 2010 by Xu Xing et al. for three skulls from Zhucheng, China. The name of its type species Sinoceratops zhuchengensis means "Chinese horned face from Zhucheng", after the location of its discovery.

Sinoceratops was a medium-sized, averagely-built, ground-dwelling, quadrupedal herbivore. It was the first ceratopsid dinosaur discovered in China, and the only ceratopsid known from Asia. All other centrosaurines, and all chasmosaurines, are known from fossils discovered in North America, except for possibly Turanoceratops. Sinoceratops is also significant because it is one of the largest known centrosaurines, and is much larger than any other known basal members of this group.

Sinoceratops was discovered in the Hongtuya Formation, which was deposited during the late Cretaceous. It lived alongside leptoceratopsids, saurolophines, and tyrannosaurines. The most common creature in the formation was Shantungosaurus, to which most of the material has been assigned. The animals living alongside Sinoceratops and Shantungosaurus were Zhuchengceratops, Zhuchengtitan, and Zhuchengtyrannus.

Discovery
 
The holotype specimen ZCDM V0010, consisting of a partial skull, including a braincase, was in the summer of 2008 recovered at the Hongtuya Formation of the Wangshi Group in Shandong, China. The specimen was collected in fluvial sediments that were deposited during the Campanian-Maastrichtian stages of the Cretaceous period, approximately 72–66 million years ago. Two other specimens have been recovered from the same formation. Specimen ZCDM V0011 is a partial skull that consists of the skull roof and most of the braincase, and ZCDM V0012 represents a partial braincase.

The genus name Sinoceratops means "Chinese horned face", and is derived from the word Sino- referring to China from Latin Sina, the country of its discovery, and the Greek words keras (κέρας) meaning "horn", and ops (ωψ) meaning "face". Sinoceratops was described and named by paleontologist Xu Xing and colleagues, in 2010. The type species is Sinoceratops zhuchengensis. The specific name refers to the location of its discovery, the city of Zhucheng which also financed the excavations.

The discovery was significant, because it represented the first ceratopsid known from China, and possibly the only ceratopsid from Asia. The only other possible Asian ceratopsid is Turanoceratops, however, its position within the Ceratopsidae is contested.

Description

It has a short, hooked horn on its nose (called a nasal horn), no horns above its eyes (brow horns), and a short neck frill with a series of forward-curving hornlets that gave the frill a crown-like appearance. Inside this row of hornlets there is a series of low knobs on the top of the frill, which are not seen in any other horned dinosaur. Sinoceratops is a member of the short-frilled ceratopsids, the Centrosaurinae. Holotype specimen ZCDM V0010 consists of a partial skull with most elements of the skull roof and partial braincase.

Features that differentiate an animal from most or all others are called a diagnosis. Some, but not all, of the features in a diagnosis are also autapomorphies. An autapomorphy is a distinctive anatomical feature that is unique to a given organism. According to Xu et al. (2010), Sinoceratops can be distinguished based on the following diagnostic characteristics: there are at least ten robust, strongly curved hornlike processes along the rear margin of the combined parietals, while at the same time at least four hornlike processes on the combined squamosals are present; there is a large accessory fenestra in front of the antorbital fenestra (differing from all other known centrosaurines); the external margin of the parietals is only weakly undulating (differing from all other known centrosaurines); and the presence of broad-based epoccipitals (differing from all other known centrosaurines).

Classification
Sinoceratops was assigned to the taxon Centrosaurinae, as a basal member by Xu et al. (2010) based on characteristics present in the skull. Sinoceratops bears several characteristics that resemble features in chasmosaurines, blurring the distinction between the Centrosaurinae and Chasmosaurinae. According to Xu e.a. the basal position of Sinoceratops indicates that ceratopsids originated in Asia. Sinoceratops however, shares a number of features with advanced centrosaurines such as Centrosaurus and Styracosaurus that are not seen in primitive centrosaurines like Diabloceratops, including a well-developed nose horn and reduced brow horns. The implication might be that this genus represents a lineage that invaded Asia from North America through Beringia.

The cladogram below represents a phylogenetic analysis by Chiba et al. (2017):

Paleoecology
 
Sinoceratops is known from the Hongtuya Formation of southern China. It is known from skull material. Alongside it, in the formation, lived Shantungosaurus, a very common hadrosaurid to which most of the material has been assigned, Zhuchengtyrannus, an Asian tyrannosaurid related to Tarbosaurus, Zhuchengceratops, an Asian leptoceratopsid, and Huaxiaosaurus, a possible older individual of Shantungosaurus.

See also 
 Timeline of ceratopsian research

References

External links

 

Centrosaurines
Late Cretaceous dinosaurs of Asia
Fossil taxa described in 2010
Taxa named by Xu Xing
Ornithischian genera